Johannes "Hans" Wölpert (September 30, 1898 – January 1, 1957) was a German weightlifter who competed in the 1928 Summer Olympics and in the 1932 Summer Olympics. He was born in Munich. In 1928 he won the bronze medal in the featherweight class. Four years later at the 1932 Games he won the silver medal in the featherweight class.

References
 

1898 births
1957 deaths
German male weightlifters
Olympic weightlifters of Germany
Olympic silver medalists for Germany
Olympic bronze medalists for Germany
Olympic medalists in weightlifting
Medalists at the 1928 Summer Olympics
Medalists at the 1932 Summer Olympics
Weightlifters at the 1928 Summer Olympics
Weightlifters at the 1932 Summer Olympics
World record setters in weightlifting
Sportspeople from Munich